Abdul Hameed Mohamed Fowzie (born 13 October 1937) is a Sri Lankan politician, a member of the Parliament of Sri Lanka and a former government minister. He was a mayor of colombo from the United National Party, and later joint the Sri Lanka Freedom Party.

He was injured while walking with a crowd in the Akuressa suicide bombing. He joined the National Government of Sri Lanka led by the United National Party as the  Minister of Disaster Management.
He entered parliament from Samagi Jana Balawegaya in 2023, after Mujibur Rahman resined to run for Colombo mayor.

See also
Cabinet of Sri Lanka

References

 
He stood for what is right and just
Lovable leader

Living people
Alumni of Zahira College, Colombo
Sri Lankan businesspeople
Members of the 10th Parliament of Sri Lanka
Members of the 11th Parliament of Sri Lanka
Members of the 12th Parliament of Sri Lanka
Members of the 13th Parliament of Sri Lanka
Members of the 14th Parliament of Sri Lanka
Members of the 15th Parliament of Sri Lanka
Government ministers of Sri Lanka
Mayors of Colombo
Provincial councillors of Sri Lanka 
Sri Lanka Freedom Party politicians
United People's Freedom Alliance politicians
1937 births
Sri Lankan Muslims
Social affairs ministers of Sri Lanka
Survivors of terrorist attacks